Paul von Joukowsky (/Pawel Wassiljewitsch Schukowski; 13 January 1845 – 26 August 1912) was a Russian-German scenic designer and writer.

Life 
Born in Sachsenhausen (Frankfurt am Main), Joukowsky was the son of the Russian poet Vasily Zhukovsky.

He was introduced to Richard and Cosima Wagner at the Villa d'Angri near Naples on 18 January 1880. Later he accompanied them on their visits to Ravello and Siena, designed the stage clothes and four of the five sets for the Bayreuth premiere cast of Parsifal, for which he was inspired on his travels with the Wagner couple.

Joukowsky died in Weimar at the age of 67.

References

External links 

 

German scenic designers
1845 births
1912 deaths